Jimmy P: Psychotherapy of a Plains Indian is a 2013 French drama film directed by Arnaud Desplechin.

Jimmy P. stars Benicio del Toro as title character Jimmy Picard, a Blackfoot Native American who has returned to Montana from World War II and suffers debilitating symptoms. Mathieu Amalric, who has appeared in most of Arnaud Desplechin’s films, plays George Devereux, a French doctor of Hungarian-Jewish background. He is called in as a specialist in ethnology and psychoanalysis. Jimmy P. is primarily based on Devereux's book, Reality and Dream: Psychotherapy of a Plains Indian (1951). The film is set at a veterans' hospital in Topeka, Kansas, during the pioneering days of psychoanalysis in the United States.

Jimmy P. was released commercially in Europe in September 2013, and was released in the US and Canada in early 2014. It received a nomination for the Palme d'Or at 2013 Cannes Film Festival, and in January 2014, three nominations at the 39th César Awards, including Best Picture, Best Director, and Best Adapted Screenplay.

Cast

Production
Desplechin, Kent Jones, and Julie Peyr wrote the screenplay, adapted from Devereux's 1951 book. The film is set primarily at a veterans' hospital in Topeka, Kansas, where Karl Menninger was among the staff treating men after World War II. With flashbacks to Jimmy Picard's life on the reservation and in Montana, the film was shot in Michigan and Montana.

Critical reception
Jimmy P. received mixed to positive reviews from critics. On Rotten Tomatoes, the film has an approval rating of 52% based on 33 reviews, with an average rating of 5.1/10. The site's critical consensus reads, "Jimmy P. has interesting ideas and talented stars, but director Arnaud Desplechin can't seem to figure out how to bring them together." On Metacritic, the film holds a score of 58 out of 100, indicating "mixed or average reviews".

The film was praised for its sensitive portrayal of Blackfoot Jimmy Picard. Matt Zoller Seitz awarded the film 3.5 out of 4 stars, commenting, "the movie offers the most psychologically complex screen portrait of a Native American character in at least twenty years, probably more" and "those who have undergone such treatment will appreciate how accurately the film portrays the process, never simplifying anything, never going for the easy dramatic epiphany, always respecting how analyst and patient circle around and around the edges of meaning."

Ty Burr of the Boston Globe wrote, "Avoiding the usual therapy-drama story beats, Desplechin has made a densely satisfying drama about Freud, racism, and sympathy in its largest sense."

A. O. Scott of The New York Times wrote:
"a reservoir of intensity in the two central performances, in particular Mr. Del Toro’s. He presents the spectacle of a man figuring himself out, using whatever tools are available: his ancestral culture, European science and his own intelligence. It is moving to witness, partly because, even when the film and the treatment have ended, so much remains to be done."

The film was nominated for the Palme d'Or at the 2013 Cannes Film Festival. In January 2014, it received three nominations at the 39th César Awards, including Best Picture, Best Director, and Best Adapted Screenplay.

References

External links
 
 

2013 films
2013 drama films
French drama films
English-language French films
Films directed by Arnaud Desplechin
Films with screenplays by Arnaud Desplechin
Films scored by Howard Shore
Worldview Entertainment films
Films set in 1948
Films set in Kansas
2010s English-language films
2010s French films